Paul Steven Porter (born September 30, 1945) was a Canadian politician. He served in the Legislative Assembly of New Brunswick from 1978 to 1987, as a Progressive Conservative member for the constituency of Carleton South.

References

Progressive Conservative Party of New Brunswick MLAs
1945 births
Living people